Hilarion (secuale name Ivitsa Serafimovski, ; born 1973) is the metropolitan of the diocese of Bregalnica of the Macedonian Orthodox Church.

References

1973 births
Members of the Macedonian Orthodox Church
People from Kumanovo
Living people